is a passenger railway station located in Aoba-ku, Yokohama, Kanagawa Prefecture, Japan, operated by the private railway company Tokyu Corporation.

Lines

Station layout 
Then station consists of two elevated island platforms serving four tracks. Two tracks are normally reserved for the through passage of express trains. The platforms are connected to the station building by underpasses.

Platforms

History
Eda Station was opened on April 1, 1966.

Passenger statistics
In fiscal 2019, the station was used by an average of 37,417 passengers daily. 

The passenger figures for previous years are as shown below.

Surrounding area
TEPCO Eda Substation
 Kanagawa Prefectural Eda High School

See also
 List of railway stations in Japan

References

External links

 

Railway stations in Kanagawa Prefecture
Railway stations in Japan opened in 1966
Railway stations in Yokohama